Vitiges (also known as Vitigis, Witiges or Wittigis) (died 542) was king of Ostrogothic Italy from 536 to 540. He succeeded to the throne of Italy in the early stages of the Gothic War of 535–554, as Belisarius had quickly captured Sicily the previous year and was in southern Italy at the head of the forces of Justinian I, the Eastern Roman Emperor.

Vitiges was the husband of Queen Amalasuntha's only surviving child, Matasuntha; therefore, his royal legitimacy was based on this marriage. The panegyric upon the wedding in 536 was delivered by Cassiodorus, the praetorian prefect, and survives, a traditionally Roman form of rhetoric that set the Gothic dynasty in a flatteringly Roman light. Soon after he was made king, Vitiges had his predecessor Theodahad murdered. Theodahad had enraged the Goths because he failed to send any assistance to Naples when it was besieged by the Byzantines, led by Belisarius.

Belisarius took both Vitiges and Matasuntha captive to Constantinople, and Vitiges died there in 542, without any children. Procopius described parallels among the deposition of Vitiges and Croesus, king of Lydia. After his death, Matasuntha married the patrician Germanus Justinus, a nephew of Justinian I by his sister Vigilantia.

In fiction
Vitiges appears as a character in the time travel novel Lest Darkness Fall, by L. Sprague de Camp. He is portrayed by Florin Piersic in the 1968 film Kampf um Rom.

References

Ostrogothic kings
6th-century kings of Italy
6th-century monarchs in Europe
People of the Gothic War (535–554)
Year of birth unknown
6th-century Ostrogothic people
542 deaths